Orocrambus catacaustus is a moth in the family Crambidae. It was described by Edward Meyrick in 1885. This species is endemic to New Zealand. It has been recorded from the South Island. The habitat consists of bogs.

The wingspan is 21–27 mm. Adults have been recorded on wing from December to March.

References

Crambinae
Moths described in 1885
Endemic fauna of New Zealand
Moths of New Zealand
Taxa named by Edward Meyrick
Endemic moths of New Zealand